Saravah! is Yukihiro Takahashi's first solo album. It is named after Pierre Barouh's record label of the same name. Takahashi conceived the album during his tenure on The Sadistics; he based his music on French pop music, this influence would later show up on early Yellow Magic Orchestra material. Besides Takahashi, this album features performances by members of The Sadistics, YMO and Tin Pan Alley. Due to the album being made before YMO members started using computers, Sakamoto got involved in arranging the music; all the keyboard parts on the album are dubbed instead of sequenced.

Track listing

Personnel
Yukihiro Takahashi - Vocals, Drums
Ryuichi Sakamoto - Keyboards (Acoustic Piano, Fender Rhodes, KORG PS-3100, ARP Odyssey, Hammond organ)
Haruomi Hosono - Electric Bass
Shigeru Suzuki - Electric guitar (1, 3-4, 8-9)
Motoya Hamaguchi - Percussion (1, 3-6, 8-9)
Rajie - Backing Vocals/Choir (1, 3, 7, 9)
Tsunehide Matsuki - Electric guitar (2, 4, 6-7)
Kazuhiko Katō - Acoustic guitar (2, 4-5)
Nobu Saitō - Percussion (2, 7)
BUZZ - Backing Vocals/Choir (3, 7, 9)
Kenji Omura - Electric guitar (4)
Tatsuo Hyashi & Hiroshi Imai - Percussion (4)
Tatsuro Yamashita & Minako Yoshida - Backing Vocals/Choir (6, 8)
Lisa Aikawa & Friends - Clapping (6)
Akira Wada - Electric guitar (7-8)
Seiichi Chiba - Recording & Mixing Engineering
Kenji Andoh & Shigeyuki Kawashima - Direction
Masayoshi Sukita - Photography
Noa Planning - Design
Hiroshi Tanaka - Management

External links 

1978 albums
Yukihiro Takahashi albums
King Records (Japan) albums